Marie-Eve Morin is a Canadian philosopher and Professor of Philosophy at the University of Alberta. From 2012 to 2018 she was the editor-in-chief of Symposium: Canadian Journal of Continental Philosophy. Morin is known for her work on post-structuralism and post-phenomenology.

Books
 Continental Realism and Its Discontents (ed.), Edinburgh University Press, 2017
 The Nancy Dictionary (ed.), Edinburgh University Press, 2015
 Jean-Luc Nancy (Key Contemporary Thinker Series). Polity Press, 2012
 Jean-Luc Nancy and Plural Thinking: Expositions of World, Politics, Art, and Sense (ed.), SUNY Press, 2012
 Jenseits der brüderlichen Gemeinschaft. Das Gespräch zwischen Jacques Derrida und Jean-Luc Nancy, Ergon Verlag, 2006

References

External links
Marie-Eve Morin at the University of Alberta
 

Phenomenologists
Continental philosophers
Political philosophers
Kant scholars
Philosophy academics
Heidegger scholars
Living people
Philosophy journal editors
University of Freiburg alumni
McGill University alumni
Academic staff of the University of Alberta
Canadian women philosophers
Canadian philosophers
Year of birth missing (living people)
Derrida scholars